Gerd Kehrer (born 7 April 1939) is a German painter.

Gallery

References

External links

Living people
1939 births
20th-century German painters
20th-century German male artists
German male painters
21st-century German painters
21st-century German male artists
Artists from Frankfurt